Timothy Behrendorff (born 26 September 1981) is an Australian professional basketball player. Behrendorff attended college at Gardner–Webb University in the United States from 2000 to 2004.

In the 2004–05 NBL season, he represented the Cairns Taipans before joining the New Zealand Breakers for the 2005–06 season.

He played in the New Zealand NBL from 2007 to 2010 with the Harbour Heat (2007 and 2008) and the Christchurch Cougars (2009 and 2010). In 2009, he was named to the NZNBL All-Star five.

Behrendorff played two seasons for the Wollongong Hawks in the NBL, averaging 2.4 points per game in the 2009–10 season, and 3.5 points per game in the 2010–11 season.

In 2011, Behrendorff played for the Ipswich Force of the QBL. Now, he is a middle school algebra teacher in the U.S.

References

External links
Profile at Eutobasket.com

1981 births
Living people
Australian expatriate basketball people in New Zealand
Australian men's basketball players
Cairns Taipans players
Christchurch Cougars players
Gardner–Webb Runnin' Bulldogs men's basketball players
Harbour Heat players
New Zealand Breakers players
Sportspeople from the Gold Coast, Queensland
Wollongong Hawks players
Centers (basketball)